The 2020–21 Aruban Division di Honor was the 60th season of the Division di Honor, the top division football competition in Aruba. Due to the COVID-19 pandemic in Aruba, the season was postponed from its normal November start date and began on 8 May 2021, with a seven-match season. The season ended with the championship game on 24 July 2021. The 2,500-capacity Trinidad Stadium is the league's most used stadium.

Table

Regular Season

Championship Playoff

Champions

External links 
Official website
Division di Honor

Aruban Division di Honor seasons
Aruba
1
Aruban Division di Honor, 2020-21